is a trans-Neptunian object (TNO) in the Kuiper belt, classified as a hot classical Kuiper belt object. It was discovered on 2 April 2011, at ESO's La Silla Observatory in Chile.

 orbits the Sun at a distance of 42.4–44.6 AU once every 286 years and 11 months (104,794 days; semi-major axis of 43.5 AU). Its orbit has an eccentricity of 0.03 and an inclination of 13° with respect to the ecliptic.

It orbits slightly outside a 3:5 resonance with Neptune, taking 16 years (5.5% of its orbit) longer to orbit the Sun than a body in 3:5 resonance. Precovery observations exist dating back to 2006 in SDSS data.

References

External links 
 
 

471288
471288
471288
20110402